

2016 Summer Olympics (FEI)
 August 7 – 19: 2016 Summer Olympics in  Rio de Janeiro at the National Equestrian Center
 Individual Dressage:
   Charlotte Dujardin (with horse Valegro)
   Isabell Werth (with horse Weihegold Old)
   Kristina Bröring-Sprehe (with horse Desperados FRH)
 Team Dressage:  ;  ;  
 Individual Eventing:
   Michael Jung (with horse Sam FBW)
   Astier Nicolas (with horse Piaf de B'Neville)
   Phillip Dutton (with horse Mighty Nice)
 Team Eventing:  ;  ;  
 Individual Jumping:
   Nick Skelton (with horse Big Star)
   Peder Fredricson (with horse All In)
   Eric Lamaze (with horse Fine Lady 5)
 Team Jumping:  ;  ;

2015–16 FEI World Cup Jumping
 March 26, 2015 – January 24, 2016:  Australian League
 Winner:  Chris Chugg (with horses Cera Cassiago and Cristalline)
 April 4, 2015 – October 17, 2015:  League
 Winner:  Tsuyoshi Ueno (with horse Verdi R.)
 April 23, 2015 – September 27, 2015: Central Asian League
 Note: This league has now been labelled as incomplete by the FEI. Each winner won 26 total points.
 Winner #1:  Umid Kamilov (with horse L'Apechio)
 Winner #2:  Gairat Nazarov (with horse Quatro Junior)
 Winner #3:  Rinat Galimov (with horse Charlize)
 April 25, 2015 – October 7, 2015:  League
 Winner:  Zhao Zhiwen (with horse Bolero)
 May 14, 2015 – November 15, 2015: South America South League
 Winner:  Pedro Junqueira Muylaert (with horse Colorado)
 May 14, 2015 – November 29, 2015:  South African League
 Winner:  Lisa Williams (with horse Campbell)
 May 14, 2015 – December 13, 2015: Central European League
 May 14, 2015 – November 29, 2015: Central European League (South Subleague)
 Winner:  Mariann Hugyecz (with horses Chacco Boy and Never Last)
 June 11, 2015 – December 13, 2015: Central European League (North Subleague)
 Winner:  Michal Kazmierczak (with Que Pasa 5)
 February 25 – 28: Central European League FINAL in  Warsaw
 Winner:  Jaroslaw Skrzyczynski (with horse Crazy Quick)
 June 11, 2015 – November 21, 2015: Caucasian League
 Note: Two winners won 15 total points each.
 Winner #1:  Rahib Ismayilov (with horse ACO's First Boy)
 Winner #2:  George Kevkhishvili (with horse Raritet)
 August 5, 2015 – February 28, 2016: North American League (East Coast)
 Winner:  Kent Farrington (with 3 horses)
 August 12, 2015 – February 14, 2016: North American League (West Coast)
 Winner:  Karl Cook (with horse Tembla)
 September 3, 2015 – February 6, 2016: 
 Winner:  Abdullah Al-Sharbatly (with 4 horses)
 September 3, 2015 – November 15, 2015: South America North League
 Winner:  Noel Vanososte (with horse Conrad D)
 October 2, 2015 – November 15, 2015: Southeast Asian League
 Note: Three winners won 18 total points each.
 Winner #1:  Nattapron Triratanachat (with horse Kalindra)
 Winner #2:  Arinadtha Chavatanont (with horses Apanachi and Looppan)
 Winner #3:  Dhewin Manathanya (with horse Blue Boy T)
 October 15, 2015 – February 7, 2016: Western European League
 Winner:  Christian Ahlmann (with 4 horses)
 October 21, 2015 – January 17, 2016:  League
 Winner:  Katie Laurie (with horse Breeze)
 March 23 – 28: Longines FEI World Cup Jumping FINAL in  Gothenburg
 Winner:  Steve Guerdat (with horse Corbinian)

2015–16 FEI World Cup Dressage
 March 26, 2015 – March 28, 2016: 2015–16 FEI World Cup Dressage Schedule
 March 26, 2015 – December 13, 2015: Asia/Pacific League
 Werribee #1 winner:  Mary Hanna (with horse Umbro)
 Werribee #2 winner:  John Thompson (with horse Bates Antonello)
 Boneo winner:  Mary Hanna (with horse Umbro)
 Sydney winner:  Mary Hanna (with horse Umbro)
 Werribee #3 (final) winner:  Mary Hanna (with horse Umbro)
 April 23, 2015 – March 6, 2016: North American League
 Winner:  Steffen Peters (with horse Legolas)
 April 30, 2015 – October 18, 2015: Central European League
 Winner:  Inessa Merkulova (with horse Mister X)
 October 15, 2015 – March 13, 2016: Western European League
 Winner:  Isabell Werth (with horses Weihegold Old and Don Johnson FRH)
 March 23 – 28: Reem Acra FEI World Cup Final (Dressage) in  Gothenburg
 Winner:  Hans Peter Minderhoud (with horse Glock's Flirt)

2016 Furusiyya FEI Nations Cup Jumping Series
 February 16 – September 25: 2016 Jumping Calendar of Events
 February 16 – 21: JS #1 in  Ocala, Florida
 Individual winner:  Beezie Madden (with horse Breitling LS)
 Team winners: The  (McLain Ward (Rothchild), Lauren Hough (Cornet), Todd Minikus (Babalou), Beezie Madden (Breitling LS))
 February 17 – 20: JS #2 in  Al Ain
 Individual winner:  Mathieu Billot (with horse Shiva D’Amaury)
 Team winners:  (Mathieu Billot (Shiva D’Amaury), Frederic David (Equador van’t Roosakker), Julien Gonin (Soleil de Cornu CH), Jerome Hurel (OHM de Ponthual))
 April 27 – May 1: JS #3 in  Lummen
 Event cancelled, due to adverse weather conditions.
 April 28 – May 1: JS #4 in  Xalapa (Coapexpan)
 Individual winner:  Nicolas Pizarro (with horse Temascaltepec)
 Team winners:  (Nicolas Pizarro (Temascaltepec), Juan Jose Zendejas Salgado (Tino la Chapelle), Federico Fernández (Guru), Jose Antonio Chedraui Eguia (La Bamba))
 May 5 – 8: JS #5 in  Linz-Ebelsberg
 Individual winner:  Eduardo Álvarez Aznar (with horse Chatman)
 Team winners:  (Michal Kazmierczak (Que Pasa), Sandra Piwowarczyk-Baluk (Chabento), Jaroslaw Skrzyczynski (Crazy Quick), Krzysztof Ludwiczak (Zoweja))
 May 12 – 15: JS #6 in  La Baule
 Individual winner:  Wout-Jan van der Schans (with horse Aquila SFN)
 Team winners: The  (Wout-Jan van der Schans (Aquila SFN), Leopold van Asten (VDL Groep Zidane N.O.P.), Jur Vrieling (VDL Glasgow VH Merelsnest), Willem Greve (Carambole N.O.P.))
 May 12 – 15: JS #7 in  Celje
 Individual winner:  Omer Karaevli (with horse Roso au Crosnier)
 Team winners:  (Rene Tebbel (Cooper), Oleksandr Onyshchenko (Calcourt Falklund), Ferenc Szentirmai (Chadino), Ulrich Kirchhoff (Gabbiano))
 May 18 – 22: JS #8 in  Odense
 Individual winner:  Manuel Añón Suárez (with horse Rackel Chavannaise)
 Team winners:  (Cassio Rivetti (Torgal de Virton), Ulrich Kirchhoff (Gabbiano), Ferenc Szentirmai (Zipper), Rene Tebbel (Giljandro van den Bosrand))
 May 24 – 29: JS #9 in  Lisbon
 Four individual winners:
  Paola Amilibia (with horse Notre Star de la Nutria)
  Eduardo Alvarez Aznar (with horse Fidux)
  Mario Wilson Fernandes (with horse Saltho de la Roque)
  Tim Wilks (with horse Quelbora Merze)
 Team winners:  (Manuel Fernandez Saro (U Watch), Paola Amilibia (Notre Star de la Nutria), Sergio Álvarez Moya (Arrayan), Eduardo Alvarez Aznar (Fidux))
 May 26 – 29: JS #10 in  Rome
 Four individual winners:
  John Whitaker (with horse Ornellaia)
  McLain Ward (with horse HH Azur)
  Pénélope Leprevost (with horse Vagabond de la Pomme)
  Malin Baryard-Johnsson (with horse H&M Cue Channa 42)
 Team winners:  (Ben Maher (Tic Tac), Jessica Mendoza (Spirit T), Michael Whitaker (Cassionato), John Whitaker (Ornellaia))
 June 1 – 5: JS #11 in  Langley, British Columbia
 Three individual winners:
  Tiffany Foster (with horse Victor)
  Daniel Coyle (with horse Tennyson)
  Conor Swail (with horse Grafton)
 Team winners:  (Juan Jose Zendejas Salgado (Tino la Chapelle), Patricio Pasquel (Babel), Francisco Pasquel (Naranjo), Alberto Michán (Gigolo van de Broekkant))
 June 2 – 5: JS #12 in  St. Gallen
 Four individual winners:
  Greg Patrick Broderick (with horse MHS Going Global)
  Lauren Hough (with horse Ohlala)
  Marcus Ehning (with horse Pret à Tout)
  Peder Fredricson (with horse H&M All In)
 Team winners:  (Denis Lynch (All Star V), Greg Patrick Broderick (MHS Going Global), Bertram Allen (Molly Malone V), Cian O'Connor (Good Luck))
 June 9 – 12: JS #13 in  Sopot
 Three individual winners:
  Max Kühner (with horse Chardonnay 79)
  Cassio Rivetti (with horse Fine Fleur du Marais)
  Nicola Philippaerts (with horse Bisquet Balou C)
 Team winners:  (Cassio Rivetti (Fine Fleur du Marais), Ulrich Kirchhoff (Prince de la Mare), Ferenc Szentirmai (Chadino), Rene Tebbel (Giljandro van den Bosrand))
 June 22 – 26: JS #14 in  Rotterdam
 Seven individual winners: For results, click here.
 Team winners: The  (Harrie Smolders (Emerald N.O.P.), Jur Vrieling (Vdl Zirocco Blue N.O.P.), Willem Greve (Carambole N.O.P.), Maikel van der Vleuten (Vdl Groep Verdi Tn N.O.P.))
 July 7 – 10: JS #15 in  Falsterbo
 11 individual winners: For results, click here.
 Team winners:  (Janika Sprunger (Bonne Chance CW), Werner Muff (Pollendr), Paul Estermann (Castlefield Eclipse), Romain Duguet (Quorida de Treho))
 July 14 – 17: JS #16 in  Budapest
 Individual winner:  Gabor Szabo Jr. (with horse Timpex Bolcsesz)
 Team winners:  (Mariann Hugyecz (Chacco Boy), Gabor Szabo Jr. (Timpex Bolcsesz), Balázs Horváth (Zordon), Laszlo Toth (Isti))
 July 20 – 24: JS #17 in  Dublin
 Eight individual winners: For results, click here.
 Team winners:  (Piergiorgio Bucci (Casallo Z), Lorenzo de Luca (Ensor de Litrange Lxii), Emilio Bicocchi (Ares), Bruno Chimirri (Tower Mouche))
 July 28 – 31: JS #18 in  Hickstead
 Five individual winners: For results, click here.
 Team winners:  (Meredith Michaels-Beerbaum (Fibonacci 17), Janne Friederike Meyer (Goja 27), Patrick Stühlmeyer (Lacan 2), Ludger Beerbaum (Chiara 222))
 August 24 – 29: JS #19 in  Gijón
 Individual winner:  Elizabeth Gingras (with horse Zilversprings)
 Team winners:  (Tim Stockdale (Fleur de l'Aube), Joe Whitaker (Lola V), Samuel Hutton (Happydam), Robert Bevis (Courtney Z))
 September 22 – 25: JS #20 (final) in  Barcelona
 Four individual winners: Identical to the list of team winners below
 Team winners:  (Christian Ahlmann (Taloubet Z), Marcus Ehning (Pret A Tout), Janne Friederike Meyer (Goja 27), Ludger Beerbaum (Casello))
 Overall Europe Division 1 winners: The 
 Overall Europe Division 2 winners: 
 Middle East winners: 
 Overall North America, Central America & Caribbean winners:

2016 FEI Nations Cup Dressage
 March 29 – July 17: 2016 Dressage Calendar of Events
 March 29 – April 3: NCD #1 in  Wellington, Florida
 Individual winner:  Laura Graves with horse Verdades
 Team winners: The 
 Laura Graves with horse Verdades
 Shelly Francis with horse Doktor
 Arlene Page with horse Woodstock
 Kasey Perry-Glass with horse Goerklintgaards Dublet
 May 12 – 15: NCD #2 in  Odense
 Individual winner:  Catherine Dufour with horse Attergaards Cassidy
 Team winners: 
 Catherine Dufour with horse Attergaards Cassidy
 Agnete Kirk Thinggaard with horse Jojo AZ
 Daniel Bachmann Andersen with horse Blue Hors Hotline
 Lisbeth Seierskilde with horse Jonstrupgårdens Raneur
 May 19 – 22: NCD #3 in  Compiègne
 Individual winner:  Kasey Perry-Glass with horse Goerklintgaards Dublet
 Team winners: The 
 Laura Graves with horse Verdades
 Shelly Francis with horse Doktor
 Allison Brock with horse Roosevelt
 Kasey Perry-Glass with horse Goerklintgaards Dublet
 June 22 – 26: NCD #4 in  Rotterdam
 Individual winner:  Hans Peter Minderhoud with horse Glock's Johnson TN N.O.P.
 Team winners: The 
 Danielle Heijkoop with horse Siro
 Adelinde Cornelissen with horse Jerich Parzival
 Diederik van Silfhout with horse Arlando N.O.P.
 Hans Peter Minderhoud with horse Glock's Johnson TN N.O.P.
 July 7 – 10: NCD #5 in  Falsterbo
 Individual winner:  Patrik Kittel with horse Delaunay
 Team winners: 
 Patrik Kittel with horse Delaunay
 Jennie Larsson with horse Zircon Spring Flower
 Rose Mathisen with horse Zuidenwind 1187
 July 13 – 17: NCD #6 (final) in  Aachen
 Individual winner:  Isabell Werth with horse Weihegold OLD
 Team winners: 
 Sonke Rothenberger with horse Cosmo 59
 Dorothee Schneider with horse Showtime FRH
 Isabell Werth with horse Weihegold OLD
 Kristina Bröring-Sprehe with horse Desperados FRH
 Overall FEI's Nations Cup Dressage champions: The  (51 points)
 Second:  (47 points)
 Third:  (40 points)

2016 FEI Nations Cup Eventing
 March 23 – October 9: 2016 Eventing Calendar of Events
 March 23 – 25: NCE #1 in  Fontainebleau
 Individual winner:  Michael Jung with horse La Biosthetique - Sam FBW
 Team winners: 
 Michael Jung with horse La Biosthetique - Sam FBW
 Sandra Auffarth with horse Opgun Louvo
 Jorg Kurbel with horse Brookfield de Bouncer
 Andreas Ostholt with horse So Is ET
 April 22 – 24: NCE #2 in  Ballindenisk (near Watergrasshill)
 Individual winner:  Pippa Funnell with horse Mirage d'Elle
 Team winners: 
 Oliver Townend with horse Cooley SRS
 Franky Reid-Warrilow with horse Dolley Whisper
 Wills Oakden with horse Merikano
 Izzy Taylor with horse Briarlands Birdsong
 May 26 – 29: NCE #3 in  Houghton Hall (Houghton, Cambridgeshire)
 Individual winner:  Nicola Wilson with horse One Two Many
 Team winners: 
 Josephine Schnauffer with horse Sambuuca
 Peter Thomsen with horse Horseware's Barney
 Bettina Hoy with horse Seigneur Medicott
 Josefa Sommer with horse Hamilton
 June 24 – 26: NCE #4 in  Strzegom
 Individual winner:  Ludvig Svennerstål with horse King Bob
 Team winners: 
 Rosalind Canter with horse Allstar B
 Izzy Taylor with horse KBIS Briarlands Matlida
 Laura Collett with horse Cooley Again
 Holly Woodhead with horse Fernhill Facetime
 July 8 – 10: NCE #5 in  The Plains, Virginia
 Individual winner:  Clark Montgomery with horse Loughan Glen
 Team winners: The 
 Clark Montgomery with horse Loughan Glen
 Phillip Dutton with horse Fernhill Fugitive
 Boyd Martin with horse Welcome Shadow
 Lauren Kieffer with horse Meadowbrook's Scarlett
 July 14 – 17: NCE #6 in  Aachen
 Individual winner:  Michael Jung with horse Fischertakinou
 Team winners: 
 Shane Rose with horse CP Qualified
 Chris Burton with horse Nobilis 18
 Samantha Birch with horse Hunter Valley ll
 Sonja Johnson with horse Parkiarrup Illicit Liaison
 September 16 – 18: NCE #7 in  Vairano
 Individual winner:  Andreas Ostholt with horse Pennsylvania 28
 Team winners: 
 François Lemière with horse Ogustin de Terroir
 Raphael Cochet with horse Sherazad de Louvière
 Rémi Pillot with horse Tol Chik du Levant
 Nicolas Mabire with horse Tourmaline du Fief
 September 22 – 25: NCE #8 in  Waregem
 Individual winner:  Stephanie Böhe with horse Haytom
 Team winners: 
 Stephanie Böhe with horse Haytom
 Leonie Kuhlmann with horse Cascora
 Franziska Keinki with horse Lancaster 149
 Andreas Dibowski with horse It's Me XX
 October 6 – 9: NCE #9 (final) in  Boekelo
 Individual winner:  Stephanie Böhe with horse Haytom
 Team winners: 
 Oliver Townend with horse Cooley SRS
 Izzy Taylor with horse Trevidden
 Laura Collett with horse Mr Bass
 Flora Harris with horse Bayano
 Overall FEI's Nations Cup Eventing champions:  (620 points)
 Second:  (600 points)
 Third:  (535 points)

2016 Spruce Meadows Jumping Tournaments
 June 8 – 12: The National
 Main event: The RBC Grand Prix presented by Rolex
 Winner:  Conor Swail (with horse Martha Louise)
 June 15 – 19: The Continental
 Main event: The CP Grand Prix
 Winner:  Peter Lutz (with horse Robin de Ponthual)
 June 28 – July 3: The Pan American
 Main event: The Pan American Cup presented by ROLEX
 Winner:  Kent Farrington (with horse Gazelle)
 July 6 – 10: The North American
 Main event: The ATCO Queen Elizabeth II Cup
 Winner:  Kent Farrington (with horse Gazelle)
 September 7 – 11: The Masters
 Main event #1: The BMO Nations Cup)
 Winners: 
 Werner Muff (with horse Pollendr)
 Alain Jufer (with horse Wiveau M)
 Nadja Peter Steiner (with horse Capuera II)
 Steve Guerdat (with horse Corbinian)
 Main event #2: The CP International Grand Prix presented by ROLEX
 Winner:  Scott Brash (with horse Ursula XII)

2016 Longines Global Champions Tour
 April 7 – November 5: 2016 Longines Global Champions Tour Schedule
 April 7 – 9: LGCT #1 in  Miami Beach, Florida Winner:  Edwina Tops-Alexander (with horse Lintea Tequila)
 April 15 – 17: LGCT #2 in  Mexico City Winner:  Roger-Yves Bost (with horse Qoud'Coeur de la Loge)
 April 21 – 24: LGCT #3 in  Antwerp Winner:  Pénélope Leprevost (with horse Flora de Mariposa)
 April 29 – May 1: LGCT #4 in  Shanghai Winner:  Abdullah Al-Sharbatly (with horse Tobalio)
 May 4 – 7: LGCT #5 in  Hamburg Winner:  Ludger Beerbaum (with horse Casello 2)
 May 19 – 22: LGCT #6 in  Madrid Winner:  Marcus Ehning (with horse Pret a Tout)
 May 26 – 29: LGCT #7 in  Chantilly, Oise Winner:  Ludger Beerbaum (with horse Chiara 222)
 June 9 – 11: LGCT #8 in  Cannes Winner:  Scott Brash (with horse Hello Forever)
 June 24 – 26: LGCT #9 in  Winner:  Emanuele Gaudiano (with horse Caspar 232)
 July 1 – 3: LGCT #10 in  Paris Winner:  Rolf-Göran Bengtsson (with horse Casall ASK)
 July 7 – 9: LGCT #11 in  Cascais-Estoril Winner:  Piergiorgio Bucci (with horse Casallo Z)
 August 4 – 7: LGCT #12 in  Valkenswaard Winner:  Rolf-Göran Bengtsson (with horse Casall ASK)
 September 8 – 11: LGCT #13 in  Rome Winner:  Harrie Smolders (with horse Don VHP Z)
 September 15 – 18: LGCT #14 in  Vienna Winner:  Marcus Ehning (with horse Comme il Faut)
 November 3 – 5: LGCT #15 (final) in  Doha Winner:  Rolf-Göran Bengtsson (with horse Casall ASK)

FISU
 June 28 – July 2: 2016 World University Equestrian Championships in  Flyinge
 Individual Dressage Test winner:  Katja Berg
 Individual Dressage Freestyle winner:  Katja Berg
 Individual Jumping winner:  Tuuli Sopanen
 Team Jumping winners:  (Rebecka Nyhlén, Moa Berrek, Fanny Götesson)
 Team Dressage winners:

Triple Crown of Thoroughbred Racing

US Triple Crown
 May 7: 2016 Kentucky Derby
 Horse:  Nyquist; Jockey:  Mario Gutierrez; Trainer:  Doug O'Neill
 May 21: 2016 Preakness Stakes
 Horse:  Exaggerator; Jockey:  Kent Desormeaux; Trainer:  J. Keith Desormeaux
 June 11: 2016 Belmont Stakes
 Horse:  Creator; Jockey:  Irad Ortiz Jr.; Trainer:  Steve Asmussen

Canadian Triple Crown
 July 3: 2016 Queen's Plate
 Horse:  Sir Dudley Digges; Jockey:  Julien Leparoux; Trainer:  Michael J. Maker
 July 26: 2016 Prince of Wales Stakes
 Horse:  Amis Gizmo; Jockey:  Luis Contreras; Trainer:  Josie Carroll
 August 21: 2016 Breeders' Stakes
 Horse:  Camp Creek; Jockey:  Rafael Manuel Hernandez; Trainer:  Rachel Halden

UK Triple Crown
 April 30: 2016 2000 Guineas Stakes
 Horse:  Galileo Gold; Jockey:  Frankie Dettori; Trainer:  Hugo Palmer
 June 4: 2016 Epsom Derby
 Horse:  Harzand; Jockey:  Pat Smullen; Trainer:  Dermot Weld
 September 10: 2016 St Leger Stakes
 Horse:  Harbour Law; Jockey:  George Baker; Trainer:  Laura Mongan

Australian Triple Crown
 March 5: 2016 Randwick Guineas
 Horse:  Le Romain; Jockey:  Christian Reith; Trainer:  Kris Lees
 March 19: 2016 Rosehill Guineas
 Horse:  Tarzino; Jockey:  Craig Newitt; Trainer:  Mick Price
 April 2: 2016 Australian Derby
 Horse:  Tavago; Jockey:  Tommy Berry; Trainers:  Trent Busuttin & Natalie Young

Hong Kong Triple Crown
 January 31: 2016 Hong Kong Stewards' Cup
 Horse:  Giant Treasure; Jockey:  Christophe Soumillon; Trainer:  Richard Gibson
 February 28: 2016 Hong Kong Gold Cup
 Horse:  Designs On Rome; Jockey:  Tommy Berry; Trainer:  John Moore
 May 22: 2016 Hong Kong Champions & Chater Cup
 Horse:  Blazing Speed; Jockey:  Neil Callan; Trainer:  Anthony S. Cruz

References

External links
 International Federation for Equestrian Sports – FEI – official website
 Inside FEI Website

 
Equestrian by year